The Saimaa Canal is a transportation canal that connects lake Saimaa with the Gulf of Finland near Vyborg, Russia. The canal was built from 1845 to 1856 and opened on 7 September 1856 (Old Style: 26 August 1856).
It was overhauled and widened in 1963–1968.

A system of inland waterways and canals in the 120 interconnected lakes of the south-central and south-east part of Finland (Finnish Lakeland) are reached through the canal. The deep channels extend all the way to Kuopio in Central Finland.

Topography
The canal begins near Lauritsala, Lappeenranta, Finland, at coordinates and ends in Vyborg, Russia, at coordinates , connecting Lake Saimaa and the Vyborg Bay. On the way, it connects Lake Nuijamaa, on the Finnish–Russian border at coordinates, and three smaller lakes in Russia.

Dimensions
 Length: 
 Finnish part: 
 Russian part: 
 Width: from 
 Total lift from the Gulf of Finland to Lake Saimaa: 
 The "Saimax" specification, in analogy to Panamax, specifies the maximum size and required equipment. The maximum dimensions allowed for a ship transiting the canal are:
 Length: 
 Beam (width): 
 Draft: 
 Height of mast: 
 Other requirements include for example that trading vessels must have two VHF radios and an automatic identification system (AIS).
 217 boundary pillars between Canal Rented Zone and main territory of Russia.

Locks
There are a total of eight locks on the canal: the upper three locks in the Finnish part of the canal, and the lower five locks situated on the Russian side of the border:

Mälkiä Lock has highest lift, Tsvetochnoye Lock has the lowest.

Bridges
The canal crosses 
 12 motor vehicles bridges:
 6 of them in Finland – 3 movable and 3 immovable
 the other 6 in Russia – 4 movable and 2 immovable 
 2 railroad bridges (one on the each side of the border), both of them are immovable.

History

The canal, inaugurated in 1856, was built between the cities of Lappeenranta and Viipuri (now part of Russia), both of them then in the autonomous Grand Duchy of Finland in the Russian Empire.

In the Moscow Peace Treaty of 1940, Finland ceded the Karelian Isthmus and Vyborg to the Soviet Union; control of the canal was divided and traffic ended.

Finland obtained a 50 year lease on the Soviet part of the canal and Maly Vysotsky Island (Ravansaari) in 1963. Finland constructed a deeper  canal, which opened in 1968. The annual rent during this lease increased only once.

In 2010, Finland obtained a second 50 year lease from Russia, starting in 2013. Maly Vysotsky was not included in the new lease. The new agreement went into effect on 17 February 2012.

Regulations pertaining to maritime rules and employment of canal staff fall under Finnish jurisdiction; in all other cases Russian laws apply. Passports are required at the international boundaries, but Russian visas are not required for just passing through the canal.

References

External links

Finnish Transport Infrastructure Agency: Saimaa Canal

Canals in Finland
Canals in Russia
Karelian Isthmus
Finland–Soviet Union relations
Canals opened in 1856
Transport in Vyborg